Angel's Egg is the fourth studio album by the progressive rock band Gong, released on Virgin Records in December 1973.

It was recorded using the Manor Mobile studio at Gong's communal home, Pavillon du Hay, Voisines, France, and mixed at The Manor, Oxfordshire, England. The album was produced by "Gong under the direction of Giorgio Gomelsky".

Angel's Egg is the second in Gong's Radio Gnome Invisible trilogy of albums, following Flying Teapot and preceding You. The trilogy forms a central part of the Gong mythology.  The original album did not have an apostrophe in the title.

The original vinyl edition came with a booklet containing an extensive explanation of the mythology, including lyrics, a glossary of terms, and profiles of characters in the story and band members.  This edition also had a gatefold cover (omitted in later pressings), a plain inky blue innersleeve to match the gatefold and booklet, and had the original black and white Virgin label which was discontinued after 1973; it was one of the last albums to use the original label.  Some copies had a sticker over top of the female nude in the moon on the cover.

The CD version released by Virgin Records, and later reissued on Charly Records contains an extra track: "Ooby-Scooby Doomsday or The D-day DJs Got the D.D.T. Blues", that ends with a male voice choir glissando (questionably regarded by some as a parody on Pink Floyd's "Echoes"), starting with "Ahhhh" and ending with "Chooo", mimicking a sneeze. The track was originally released on the Live Etc. album but was excluded from the CD release (which reissued that double album as one disc), and included on this album instead.

Track listing 

Unusual spellings are as listed on the cover of the original edition. Also, take note that in some CD editions, on the back cover, tracks 7 and 8 are numbered 7a and 7b so that tracks 9-15 have a unity less than the CD reader (included the bonus track that numbers 14 on the cover and 15 on the CD reader).

The instrumental section at the end of "Sold to the Highest Buddha" is referred to as "6/8 sax" in the cover notes, and became a separate piece titled "6/8" on Gong Live Etc. "Selene" is a completely different song from one with the same title on an earlier Gong album, Camembert Electrique.

Later CD editions add more bonus tracks, including demo vocal versions with altered mixing.

Charts

Personnel 
Note: Pseudonyms and absurd instrument names selected by Daevid Allen are used on the album credits; real names are used in composer credits, and are shown in brackets.
 Bloomdido Bad De Grasse (Didier Malherbe) – ten/sop sax, floot, bi-focal vocal
 Shakti Yoni (Gilli Smyth) – space whisper, loin cackle
 T. Being esq. (Mike Howlett, spelled Howlitt on composer credits) – basso profundo
 Sub. Capt. Hillage (Steve Hillage) – lewd guitar
 Hi T. Moonweed (the favourite) (Tim Blake) – Cynthia "size a", lady voce
 Pierre de Strasbourg (Pierre Moerlen, spelled Moerlin on composer credits) – bread & batteur drums, vibes, marimba
 Mirielle de Strasbourg (Mireille Bauer) – glockenspiel
 Dingo Virgin (Daevid Allen) – local vocals, aluminium croon, glissando guitar

References

External links 
 

1973 albums
Concept albums
Gong (band) albums
Progressive rock albums by British artists
Space rock albums